Prarthana is a 1943 Indian Hindi-language social film directed by Sarvottam Badami for Sohrab Modi's  Minerva Movietone. The music director was Saraswati Devi and the lyricist was Safdar Aah Sitapuri. Having worked for Madan Theatres Ltd and Sagar Movietone in the 1930s, the famous singer and actress Jehanara Kajjan returned to work after a hiatus of four years working for studios like Minerva Movietone. Prarthana is cited as "probably" her last film before her death in 1944. The film starred Motilal, Jahanara Kajjan, Sabita Devi, Sajjan, Nimabalkar, K. N. Singh, Sadat Ali, Mehboob and Abu Bakar.

Cast
 Motilal
 Kajjanbai
 Sabita Devi
 K. N. Singh
 Sajjan
 Nimbalkar
 Sajjan
 Sadat Ali
 Mehboob 
 Ghulam Hussain
 Abu Bakar
 Nimbalkar
 Menaka.
 Shorrey.

Music
The music was by Saraswati Devi with lyrics by Safdar Aah. The singers were Jahanara Kajjan, Vasant, Rehmat Bai and Moolchand. The song "Aaya Sawan Aaja" sung by Kajjan with relative ease, was in the raga Brindabani Sarang. Other popular songs of Kajjan from this film are, "Kahe Neha Lagaye Sajaniya" and "Ek Dhundhla Sa Mohabbat Ka Hai Nasha Baaki".

Song List

References

External links

1943 films
1940s Hindi-language films
Indian drama films
Indian black-and-white films
Films directed by Sarvottam Badami
1943 drama films
Hindi-language drama films